Ready-made garments are mass-produced finished textile products of the clothing industry. Ready-made are garments that can be bought off of store racks or online, and are ready to wear. They are not custom tailored according to measurements, but rather generalized according to anthropometric studies to fit a general range. They are made from many different fabrics and yarns. Their characteristics depend on the fibers used in their manufacture. Ready-made garments are divided into the following types: outer clothing, which includes workwear and uniforms, leisure wear, and sportswear (e.g., suits, pants, dresses, ladies' suits, blouses, blazers, jackets, cardigans, sweaters, coats, sports jackets, skirts, shirts, ties,  jeans, shorts, T-shirts, polo shirts, sports shirts, tracksuits, bathing shorts, bathing suits); and undergarments, which include jersey goods and lingerie (e.g. underpants, undershirts, socks, stockings, and pantyhose).

History
The first ready-made garment factory was established in New York in 1831. During the American Civil War the need for ready-made uniforms helped the garment sector grow in the United States. Near the end of the nineteenth century there were changes in societal views towards ready-made garments: They were no longer seen as only for the lower classes but also for the middle classes. This trend started in the United States. In the beginning they were more popular with men than women. In the late 1860s, twenty-five percent of garments produced in the US were ready-made, but by 1890, the portion had risen to sixty percent. By 1951, ninety percent of garments sold in the United States were ready made. During the same time two-thirds of garments sold in France were ready made.

Top ready-made garment manufacturing countries  
Every country has some garment manufacturing company to meet the minimum needs of that country’s demand. However, all of them are not world-class. Among them, here are the top garment manufacturing countries in the world according to the manufacturing index.

 China
 Germany
 Bangladesh
 Vietnam
 India
 Italy
 Turkey
 United States of America
 Hong-Kong (China SAR)
 Spain

The ready-made garment (RMG) industry is flourishing in Bangladesh because of its export-quota system and cheap labor. The main diversifications of the ready-made garment industry in Bangladesh are exportations to the United States and the European Union. In 2005, the eventual phase-out of the export-quota system had raised competitiveness. However, long-term development and deep-level competitiveness are concluded to be hindered long-term. However, long-term development and deep-level competitiveness are concluded to be hindered long-term. Additionally, the RMG industry in Bangladesh has suffered workplace disasters and fatalities. Bangladesh has since launched different initiatives to improve worker and factory safety.

Benefits

-Buyers and suppliers enable stakeholders for the sake of making profit-oriented business decisions to create a better supplier-buyer network.
-In-depth analysis can determine the prevailing market opportunities.
-Regions where the production of readymade garments helps their country industry.
-The market player positioning segment facilitates benchmarking and provides a clear understanding of the present position of the market players in the readymade garment industry.

See also
 Ready-to-wear
 Bangladeshi RMG Sector
Alliance for Bangladesh Worker Safety

References

Clothing
Clothing industry
Mass production